MotoMaster is the in-house line of automotive products sold exclusively at Canadian Tire stores.  MotoMaster products ranged from oil filters and air filters, to MotoMaster branded tires. As of 2011, MotoMaster was the most popular replacement tire brand in Canada, with 13% market share by unit volume of the passenger replacement tire market and 10% market share by unit volume of the light truck replacement tire market.

MotoMaster has its own sub-brands to distinguish premium products such as "Eliminator" which distinguished premium products from their less expensive lines for items like automotive batteries, booster packs and battery charges.  The 'Rough Rider' light truck tire sub-brand was replaced with 'Total Terrain' in recent years.  'Formula 1' was created initially to push their synthetic lines but expanded with the disappearance of other lines into conventional, diesel, marine, transmission and power steering oils as well as a number of other gear oils.  Despite the expansion, MotoMaster's Supreme sub-brand continues to exist as an entry level oil product.  The 'Mastercraft' sub-brand is their mid-level tool-line, such as screw drivers and socket sets while 'Mastercraft Maximum' is their premium tool brand.  JobMate is a rebranded product line for entry-level tools sold by Canadian Tire.

The MotoMaster line has shrunk somewhat in recent years as the store has moved towards brand name products.  For example, in early 2003, the line of MotoMaster spark plugs were fully discontinued in favour of carrying only brand names such as Champion, NGK, AC Delco, and Bosch.  In 2004, the Formula 1 line of oil filters was discontinued, and in 2002, the 'Motomaster 60' line of batteries was replaced with the more generic 'Sure Start'.  One reason for the gradual reduction of the MotoMaster line is the existence of the PartSource chain, of which 63 locations are fully owned and operated by the Canadian Tire Corporation as of May 2007.  Though these stores carry many of the same products and share much of their supply chain, Part Source operates at arm's length from Canadian Tire but shares some backoffice operations.

Although the MotoMaster name remains on a wide variety of tires, the selection has shrunk recently.  In 2004, MotoMaster discontinued the Sentinel A/S and Touring 160 tires leaving the brand with the Touring AW/H and SE2 lines.  MotoMaster dropped their Performance line of tires and Canadian Tire no longer has a specific Premium Tire category having folded it into the Touring categories.

Some regard MotoMaster as an entry level line of tires despite the tires being produced for Canadian Tire by larger companies such as Michelin (SE2), Cooper (SE3, Winter Edge) and BF Goodrich. Some tires such as Goodyear Nordic winter tires are exclusive to Canadian Tire but not marketed under the MotoMaster umbrella.

References

Auto parts suppliers of Canada
Canadian Tire
Store brands